North Bougainville District is a district of the Autonomous Region of Bougainville of Papua New Guinea. Its capital is Buka. North Bougainville languages are spoken in the district.

Local-level governments
 Atolls Rural
 Buka Rural
 Kunua Rural
 Nissan Rural
 Selau-Suir Rural
 Tinputz Rural

References

Districts of Papua New Guinea
Autonomous Region of Bougainville
Buka, Papua New Guinea